The North American Guqin Association (often abbreviated to NAGA) is a guqin society based in the State of California, in the United States, which serves guqin players on the West Coast of the United States. Of the three major qin societies of the West (the other two being the London Youlan Qin Society and the New York Qin Society), this society was the world's largest English speaking online community for the guqin (before the advent of other social media platforms) and has the most connections and scope of activities.

History
NAGA was founded by the qin player Wang Fei in 1997 who is the current director of the society. As of 2006, the society is recognized as a nonprofit organization under Section 501(c)(3) of the Internal Revenue Service.

NAGA is the only society outside China to be instrumental in instigating an official 'Guqin Day' in the city of Milpitas in 2007. The day was set on 7 November.

Activities
NAGA organises regular yajis as well as excursions and events. This also includes classes for guqin and sometimes a qin master is invited over from China to teach for a few days. It is also represented by some members when they attend conferences and events in China.

It has also introduced an innovation called a yalon (an amalgamation of yaji and the French salon) as a gathering of Eastern and Western musical traditions.

Membership
Membership, which essentially is a subscription to a mailing list, is open to all who have an interest in qin music and only requires an online registration. The society comprises 3 officers, several board members, consultants and numerous ordinary members. There are no membership fees or requirements.

Notes

References

External links
NAGA's official site (inactive since 2017)

Guqin
Guqin organizations